Live in Geneva may refer to:

Live in Geneva (Wishbone Ash album), 1995
Live in Geneva (Merzbow album), 2005